Blakey is an album by drummer Art Blakey recorded in 1954 and originally released on the EmArcy label as a 10-inch LP. The album was rereleased on CD in 1999 with bonus tracks originally released on the album Introducing Joe Gordon. The album has also been released as "The Complete Art Blakey On EmArcy", including four songs from a March 24 recording session.

Reception

Allmusic awarded the album 4 stars calling it "a mandatory acquisition for Blakey fans and those who enjoy bop".

Track listing 
All compositions by Gigi Gryce except as indicated
 "Minority" - 3:09  
 "Salute to Birdland" - 3:01  
 "Eleanor" - 2:55  
 "Futurity" - 2:57  
 "Simplicity" - 2:52  
 "Strictly Romantic" - 2:47  
 "Hello" - 2:41  
 "Mayreh" (Horace Silver) - 3:18  
 "Rifftide" (Coleman Hawkins) - 6:27 Bonus track on CD reissue 
 "Lady Bob" (Quincy Jones) - 6:54 Bonus track on CD reissue   
 "Grasshopper" (Jones) - 6:58 Bonus track on CD reissue   
 "The Theme" (Kenny Dorham) - 7:39 Bonus track on CD reissue   
 "Bous Bier" (Jones) - 6:46 Bonus track on CD reissue   
 "Xochimilco" (Joe Gordon) - 6:18 Bonus track on CD reissue   
 "Evening Lights" (Gordon) - 4:21 Bonus track on CD reissue  
 "Body and Soul" (Frank Eyton, Johnny Green, Edward Heyman, Robert Sour) - 4:25 Bonus tracks on CD reissued. Originally released by Emarcy records as Introducing Joe Gordon in 1954 and then again on 12 inch LP in 1955 with 2 extra tunes added.

Personnel 
Art Blakey - drums
Joe Gordon - trumpet 
Gigi Gryce - alto saxophone (tracks 1-8)
Charlie Rouse - tenor saxophone (tracks 9-16)
Walter Bishop, Jr. (tracks 1-8), Junior Mance (tracks 9-16) - piano
Bernie Griggs (tracks 1-8), James Schenk (tracks 9-16) - bass

References 

Art Blakey albums
1954 albums
EmArcy Records albums
Albums produced by Bob Shad